The 1972 United States presidential election in Kansas took place on November 7, 1972. All fifty states and the District of Columbia, were part of the 1972 United States presidential election. Voters chose seven electors to the Electoral College, which voted for President and Vice President.

Kansas was won by incumbent Republican President Richard Nixon by a landslide of 38 points; Nixon succeeded in securing re-election against Democratic Senator George McGovern of South Dakota. Nixon ran with Vice President, and former Maryland Governor, Spiro Agnew for vice president, and McGovern ran with United States Ambassador Sargent Shriver for vice president. In the midst of a nationwide Republican landslide, Nixon took 67.66 percent of Kansas’ vote to McGovern's 29.50%.

Kansas voters turned out heavily for Nixon, who won every county in the state, making it the last time any presidential candidate has won every single county in the state. McGovern's loss was heavily influenced by his portrayal as a left-wing extremist by the Republican Party throughout the campaign. , this is the last election – and the sole election since 1932 – that the Republican presidential nominee carried Wyandotte County, home to Kansas City.

Results

Results by county

See also
 United States presidential elections in Kansas

References

Kansas
1972
United States presidential